Eric Newell Olson (born September 27, 1955 in Rochester, New York) is an American molecular biologist.  He is professor and chair of the Department of Molecular Biology at the University of Texas Southwestern Medical Center in Dallas, where he also holds the Robert A. Welch Distinguished Chair in Science, the Annie and Willie Nelson Professorship in Stem Cell Research, and the Pogue Distinguished Chair in Research on Cardiac Birth Defects.

Biography
Olson grew up in North Carolina and attended Wake Forest University, receiving a B.A. in Chemistry and Biology, and a Ph.D. in Biochemistry.  After postdoctoral training at Washington University School of Medicine, he began his scientific career at MD Anderson Cancer Center in Houston.  In 1995, he founded the Department of Molecular Biology at The University of Texas Southwestern Medical Center in Dallas.

Olson and his trainees discovered many of the key genes and mechanisms responsible for development of the heart and other muscles.  His laboratory also unveiled the signaling pathways responsible for pathological cardiac growth and heart failure.  Olson’s discoveries at the interface of developmental biology and medicine have illuminated the fundamental principles of organ formation and have provided new concepts in the quest for cardiovascular therapeutics.  His most recent work has provided a new strategy for correction of Duchenne muscular dystrophy using CRISPR gene editing.

Olson is a member of the U.S. National Academy of Sciences, the Institute of Medicine, and the American Academy of Arts and Sciences.  His work has been recognized by numerous awards, including the Basic Research Prize and Research Achievement Award from the American Heart Association, the Pasarow Medical Research Award, the Pollin Prize, the Passano Award, and the March of Dimes Prize in Developmental Biology.  In 2009, the French Academy of Science awarded Dr. Olson the Lefoulon-Delalande Grand Prize for Science.  He is among the most highly cited scientists in the world, with his work having been cited over 100,000 times in the scientific literature.

Olson has co-founded multiple biotechnology companies to design new therapies for heart muscle disease. He was cofounder of Myogen, Inc, a biotechnology company focusing on therapies to intervene with pathological cardiac signaling.  In 2007, he co-founded miRagen Therapeutics to develop microRNA-based therapeutics.  In 2017, he co-founded Tenaya Therapeutics, which is leveraging gene regulatory mechanisms to promote heart regeneration and repair. Most recently, he founded Exonics Therapeutics, to advance gene editing as a therapy for Duchenne muscular dystrophy.

In his spare time, he plays guitar and harmonica with The Transactivators, a rock band inspired by the Texas troubadour, Willie Nelson, who created the Professorship that supports his research.

Awards and honors
 1998 Fellow, American Academy of Arts and Sciences
 1998 Edgar Haber Cardiovascular Medicine Research Award, American Heart Association
 1999 American Heart Association Basic Research Prize
 1999 Gill Heart Institute Award for Outstanding Contributions to Cardiovascular Medicine
 1999 Elected to U.S. National Academy of Sciences
 2000 Pasarow Award in Cardiovascular Medicine
 2000 NIH MERIT Award
 2001 Elected to the Institute of Medicine of National Academy of Sciences
 2003 Founding Distinguished Scientist Award, American Heart Association
 2003 Louis and Artur Lucian Award for Research in Cardiovascular Diseases, McGill University
 2005 Outstanding Investigator Award, International Society for Heart Research (ISHR)
 2005 Pollin Prize for Pediatric Research, Columbia University
 2008 American Heart Association Research Achievement Award
 2009 LeFoulon Delalande Grand Prix Awarded by the Institut de France and French Academy of Science
 2012 Passano Award, Passano Foundation
 2013 March of Dimes Prize in Developmental Biology, March of Dimes
 2016 Eugene Braunwald Academic Mentorship Award, American Heart Association

References

External links
 Olson Lab Website
 UT Southwestern Medical Center Department of Molecular Biology

1955 births
Living people
American molecular biologists
University of Texas Southwestern Medical Center faculty
Wake Forest University alumni
People from North Carolina
21st-century American biologists
People from Rochester, New York
Scientists from New York (state)
Members of the National Academy of Medicine